The 2015 Ole Miss Rebels football team represented the University of Mississippi in the 2015 NCAA Division I FBS football season. The Rebels played their home games at Vaught–Hemingway Stadium in Oxford, Mississippi and competed in the Western Division of the Southeastern Conference (SEC). They were led by fourth-year head coach Hugh Freeze.

Previous season
The 2014 Ole Miss Rebels football team finished the regular season 9–3, with their only losses to Arkansas, Auburn, and LSU. Ole Miss knocked out two top 5 teams during the season, #3 Alabama and #4 Mississippi State. The Rebels were ranked as high at #3 in the AP Poll and were in the mix to be a part of the all-new College Football Playoff until their back-to-back losses to LSU and Auburn. At the end of the regular season the Rebels were ranked #9 in the College Football Playoff Rankings after defeating Mississippi State in the Egg Bowl. The Rebels were invited to play in the 2014 Peach Bowl against the #6 TCU Horned Frogs of the Big 12 Conference. Ole Miss fell short to the Horned Frogs in Atlanta, Georgia , losing 42–3.

2015 recruiting class
The 2015 Ole Miss recruiting class finished with 23 total commits, and finished in the top 20 recruiting classes of 2015 according to 247 sports. The Rebels signed seven four star recruits and fifteen three star recruits, but the only five star recruit they signed was wide receiver Damarkus Lodge.

Coaching staff

Source:

Schedule
Ole Miss announced its 2015 football schedule on October 14, 2014. The 2015 schedule consists of 7 home games and 5 away games in the regular season and is considered to be the 10th toughest schedule in the FBS for the 2015 season. The Rebels will host SEC foes Arkansas, LSU, Texas A&M, and Vanderbilt, and will travel to Alabama, Auburn, Florida, and Mississippi State.

Schedule Source:

Game summaries

UT Martin

Fresno State

No. 2 Alabama

Vanderbilt

No. 25 Florida

New Mexico State

Memphis

No. 15 Texas A&M

Auburn

Arkansas

No. 15 LSU

No. 21 Mississippi State

No. 16 Oklahoma State

Rankings

References

Ole Miss
Ole Miss Rebels football seasons
Sugar Bowl champion seasons
Ole Miss Rebels football